Krishna Gopalayyan was an Indian administrator who served as the  Diwan of Travancore from 1768 to 1776.

References  
 

18th-century Indian people
Diwans of Travancore
Year of birth missing